Dixon Branch is a stream in Preble County, Ohio. The  stream is a tributary of Four Mile Creek.

Dixon Branch bears the name of an early settler.

See also
List of rivers of Ohio

References

Rivers of Preble County, Ohio
Rivers of Ohio